Bad Debts (1996) is a Ned Kelly Award-winning novel by Australian author Peter Temple.  This is the first novel in the author's Jack Irish series.

Dedication
"For Anita and Nicholas : true believers."

Awards

Ned Kelly Awards for Crime Writing, Best First Novel, 1997: joint winner

Notes

 Also published in USA (in 2005 by MacAdam/Cage), in Canada (in 2006 by Anchor Canada), in the UK (in 2007 by Quercus) and in the Netherlands, in a Dutch-language edition (in 2002 by De Boekerij) with a translation by Paul Witte.
 Adapted into an Australian television movie Jack Irish: Bad Debts

Reviews

 "Australian Crime Fiction Database" 

1996 Australian novels
Novels by Peter Temple
Novels set in Melbourne
Ned Kelly Award-winning works
HarperCollins books
1996 debut novels